Shelley Ludford (born 8 December 1998) is a British judoka.

Judo career
Ludford is three times champion of Great Britain, winning the half-heavyweight (-78kg) division at the British Judo Championships in 2017, 2019 and 2022.

As a junior she won the 2018 European Junior Cup in Kaunas and the following year she won the Senior European Cup in Podčetrtek.

References

1998 births
Living people
British female judoka
20th-century British women
21st-century British women